Graphipterus serrator is a species of beetles in the family Carabidae.

Subspecies
 Graphipterus serrator heydeni Kraatz, 1890 
 Graphipterus serrator serrator Forsskål, 1775 
 Graphipterus serrator valdanii Guérin-Méneville, 1859

Description
This ground beetle is quite variable in the body size and in the development of the spots. Larvae in the preimaginal stage have myrmecophagous habits. They make chambers inside the ant nest where they store the ant brood.

Distribution and habitat
This species is widespread in North Africa from Egypt to Mauritania. It lives in African savannas and semideserts.

References
 Biolib
 jcringenbach.free.fr
 T. Zetto Brandmayr,  I. Marano,  W. Paarmann  Graphipterus serrator: a myrmecophagous carabid beetle with mandibular suctorial tube in the larva (Coleoptera, Carabidae, Graphipterini)
 [Johan Kotze  Carabid Beetles as Bioindicators

Lebiinae
Beetles described in 1775
Taxa named by Peter Forsskål